The East Africa Christian Alliance (EACA) is a fundamentalist organization and regional arm of the International Council of Christian Churches, set up in opposition to the All Africa Conference of Churches. The current chairman is Bishop Richard Kivai.

History
EACA was founded in January 1965 by Dr Carl McIntire. It has a graduate theological school, Faith College of the Bible.

World Congresses
2015
2013

Denominations
There are 10 denominations under EACA. They are:

 Independent Presbyterian Church, Mwingi, Kenya
 Holy Trinity Church in Africa, Kisumu, Kenya
 Africa Gospel Unity Church, Bomet, Kenya
 Kenya Church of God in Africa, Kirinyaga, Kenya
 Church of Jesus Christ in Kenya, Kerugoya, Kenya
 East Africa Divinity Church, Embu, Kenya
 Gospel Tabernacle Church, Mombassa, Kenya
 Good News Church of Africa, Eldoret, Kenya
 Church of the Holy Spirit Buhaya, Mission Butainamwa, Kianja, Bukoba, Tanzania
 Kanisa La Neema, Sumbawanga, Tanzania

References

Christian organizations established in 1965
Christian fundamentalism